Noal  is a bairro in the District of Sede in the municipality of Santa Maria, in the Brazilian state of Rio Grande do Sul. It is located in west Santa Maria.

Villages 
The bairro contains the following villages: Noal, Vila Arco-Íris, Vila Kosoroski, Vila Lídia, Vila Natal, Vila Noal, Vila Pantaleão, Vila Rohde, Vila San Martin.

Gallery of photos

References 

Bairros of Santa Maria, Rio Grande do Sul